Vladimír Páral (born August 10, 1932) is Czech fiction writer whose work ranges from biting satire to works of Socialist Realism, produced under the communist regime.

Biography
Although born in Prague, he spent his early years in Brno, where his father was a military officer. After graduating from secondary school, he received technical training then went on to study chemical engineering at a branch of the University of Chemistry and Technology in Pardubice; graduating in 1954.

He worked at various locations until 1967, when he took a permanent position at the Institute of Scientific, Technical and Economic Information. He had begun writing in 1962, and made contributions to the local daily, Průboj, under the name Jan Laban. Five years later, he started to write novels and, in 1972, became an editor at Severočeském nakladatelství.

In 1992, some classified documents were leaked, including a list of people who had allegedly  worked for the StB (secret police), and Páral's name was on that list.

Since 1995, he has divided his time between Prague and Mariánské Lázně.

Bibliography

Black pentalogy
Veletrh splněných přání (Fair granted wishes), 1964
Soukromá vichřice: Laboratorní zpráva ze života hmyzu (Private storm: Laboratory note of insect's life), 1966
Katapult: Jízdní řád železničních, lodních a leteckých drah do ráje (Catapult: Traffic order of railway, shipment and airlines into paradise), 1967
Milenci a vrazi: Magazín ukájení před rokem 2000 (Lovers and murders: Magazine of cater before year 2000), 1969
Profesionální žena: Román pro každého (Professional woman: Novel for everyone), 1971

White pentalogy
Mladý muž a bílá velryba: Malý chemický epos (Young man and white whale: Little chemical epic), 1973
Radost až do rána: O křečcích a lidech (Joy until morning: About hamsters and people), 1975
Generální zázrak: Román naděje (General miracle: Romance of hope), 1977
Muka obraznosti: Konfrontace snu a skutečnosti (Agony of  symbolic: Confrontation of dream and reality), 1980

Sci-fi
Romeo & Julie 2300, 1982
Pokušení A-ZZ (Tepmting A-ZZ), 1982
Válka s mnohozvířetem (War with manybeast), 1983
Země žen (World of woman), 1987

Recent works
Dekameron 2000 aneb Láska v Praze, 1990
Kniha rozkoší, smíchu a radosti, 1992
Playgirls 1 and 2, 1994
Profesionální muž, 1995
Tam za vodou, 1995

References

1932 births
Living people